Native may refer to:

People
 Jus soli, citizenship by right of birth
 Indigenous peoples, peoples with a set of specific rights based on their historical ties to a particular territory
 Native Americans (disambiguation)

In arts and entertainment
 Native (band), a French R&B band
 Native (comics), a character in the X-Men comics universe
 Native (album), a 2013 album by OneRepublic
 Native (2016 film), a British science fiction film
 The Native, a Nigerian music magazine

In science
 Native (computing), software or data formats supported by a certain system
 Native language, the language(s) a person has learned from birth
 Native metal, any metal that is found in its metallic form, either pure or as an alloy, in nature
 Native species, a species whose presence in a region is the result of only natural processes

Other uses
 Northeast Arizona Technological Institute of Vocational Education (NATIVE), a technology school district in the Arizona portion of the Navajo Nation

See also
 Aborigine (disambiguation)
 Autochthon (disambiguation)
 Indigenous (disambiguation)
 Nativism (disambiguation)
 Nativity (disambiguation)